The Republic of Honduras has many historical monuments relating to its pre-Columbian native past, as well as its Spanish colonial era and republican period. The law for the Protection of the Cultural Heritage of Honduras considers examples of historical monuments, fine furniture, and expressions of folk art (folclórica) worthy of preservation.

Background 
The Historical Monument and National Heritage act was passed by the National Congress of Honduras. It is administered by the Honduran Institute of Anthropology and History (IHAH) with legal status and its own assets. Under Honduran law, all archaeological and historical sites and objects are the property of the people of Honduras, with the Instituto Hondureño de Antropología e Historia the guardian of this commonwealth. IHAH is charged with conducting and regulating research, with managing both the movable property and sites, and with disseminating knowledge of this patrimony to the people.

A special office, the Fiscalia de Etnias, currently occupied by Jany del Cid (2012), prosecutes violations of the law concerning national patrimony. Controversially, the state government of Honduras does not actually pay the bill for most of this important work. It pays less than a third of the budget. The rest comes mainly from admission fees.

List of historical monuments

Historical buildings of Tegucigalpa

Historical buildings of Juticalpa

References 

Honduran culture
Historic sites in Honduras